Gocha Gakharia (born 23 October 1973) is a Georgian diver. He competed in the men's 10 metre platform event at the 1996 Summer Olympics.

References

1973 births
Living people
Male divers from Georgia (country)
Olympic divers of Georgia (country)
Divers at the 1996 Summer Olympics
Sportspeople from Tbilisi